The Guanches were the indigenous inhabitants of the Canary Islands in the Atlantic Ocean some  west of Africa. 

It is believed that they may have arrived on the archipelago some time in the first millennium BCE. The Guanches were the only native people known to have lived in the Macaronesian archipelago region before the arrival of Europeans, as there is no accepted evidence that the other Macaronesian archipelagos (the Cape Verde Islands, Madeira and the Azores) were inhabited. After the Spanish conquest of the Canaries starting in the early 15th century,  many natives were wiped out by the Spanish settlers  while others interbred with the settler population,  although elements of their culture survive within Canarian customs and traditions, such as Silbo (the whistled language of La Gomera Island). Some scholars have classified the destruction of the Guanche people and culture as an early example of colonial genocide.

In 2017, the first genome-wide data from the Guanches confirmed a North African origin and that they were genetically most similar to ancient North African Berber peoples of the nearby African mainland.

Etymology
The native term guanachinet literally translated means "person of Tenerife" (from Guan = person and Achinet = Tenerife). It was modified, according to Juan Núñez de la Peña, by the Castilians into "Guanches". Though etymologically being an ancient, Tenerife-specific, term, the word Guanche is now mostly used to refer to the pre-Hispanic Indigenous inhabitants of the entire archipelago.

Historical background

Prehistory

Genetic evidence shows that northern African people made a significant contribution to the aboriginal population of the Canaries following desertification of the Sahara at some point after 6000 BC. Linguistic evidence suggests ties between the Guanche language and the Berber languages of North Africa, particularly when comparing numeral systems. Research into the genetics of the Guanche population have led to the conclusion that they share an ancestry with Berber peoples.

The islands were visited by a number of peoples within recorded history. The Numidians, Phoenicians, and Carthaginians knew of the islands and made frequent visits, including expeditions dispatched from Mogador by Juba. The Romans occupied northern Africa and visited the Canaries between the 1st and 4th centuries AD, judging from Roman artifacts found on and near the island of Lanzarote. These show that Romans did trade with the Canaries, though there is no evidence of them ever settling there. Archaeology of the Canaries seems to reflect diverse levels of technology, some differing from the Neolithic culture that was encountered at the time of conquest.

It is thought that the arrival of the aborigines to the archipelago led to the extinction of some big reptiles and insular mammals, for example Canariomys bravoi, the giant rat of Tenerife.

Roman author and military officer Pliny the Elder, drawing upon the accounts of Juba II, king of Mauretania, stated that a Mauretanian expedition to the islands around 50 BC found the ruins of great buildings, but otherwise no population to speak of. If this account is accurate, it may suggest that the Guanches were not the only inhabitants, or the first ones; or that the expedition simply did not explore the islands thoroughly. Tenerife, specifically the archaeological site of the Cave of the Guanches in Icod de los Vinos, has provided habitation dates dating back to the 6th century BC, according to analysis carried out on ceramics that were found inside the cave.

Strictly speaking, the Guanches were the indigenous peoples of Tenerife. The population seems to have lived in relative isolation up to the time of the Castilian conquest, around the 14th century (though Genoese, Portuguese, and Castilians may have visited there from the second half of the 8th century onwards). The name came to be applied to the indigenous populations of all the seven Canary Islands, those of Tenerife being the most important or powerful.

What remains of their language, Guanche – a few expressions, vocabulary words and the proper names of ancient chieftains still borne by certain families – exhibits positive similarities with the Berber languages. The first reliable account of the Guanche language was provided by the Genoese explorer Nicoloso da Recco in 1341, with a translation of numbers used by the islanders.

According to European chroniclers, the Guanches did not possess a system of writing at the time of conquest; the writing system may have fallen into disuse or aspects of it were simply overlooked by the colonizers. Inscriptions, glyphs and rock paintings and carvings are quite abundant throughout the islands. Petroglyphs attributed to various Mediterranean civilizations have been found on some of the islands. In 1752, Domingo Vandewalle, a military governor of Las Palmas, attempted to investigate them, and Aquilino Padron, a priest at Las Palmas, catalogued inscriptions at El Julan, La Candía and La Caleta on El Hierro. In 1878 Dr. René Verneau discovered rock carvings in the ravines of Las Balos that resemble Libyan or Numidian writing dating from the time of Roman occupation or earlier. In other locations, Libyco-Berber script has been identified.

Pre-conquest exploration

The geographic accounts of Pliny the Elder and of Strabo mention the Fortunate Isles but do not report anything about their populations. An account of the Guanche population may have been made around AD 1150 by the Arab geographer Muhammad al-Idrisi in the Nuzhatul Mushtaq, a book he wrote for King Roger II of Sicily, in which al-Idrisi reports a journey in the Atlantic Ocean made by the Mugharrarin ("the adventurers"), a family of Andalusian seafarers from Lisbon. The only surviving version of this book, kept at the Bibliothèque Nationale de France, and first translated by Pierre Amédée Jaubert, reports that, after having reached an area of "sticky and stinking waters", the Mugharrarin moved back and first reached an uninhabited Island (Madeira or Hierro), where they found "a huge quantity of sheep, which its meat was bitter and inedible" and, then, "continued southward" and reached another island where they were soon surrounded by barks and brought to "a village whose inhabitants were often fair haired with long and flaxen hair and the women of a rare beauty". Among the villagers, one did speak Arabic and asked them where they came from. Then the king of the village ordered them to bring them back to the continent where they were surprised to be welcomed by Berbers. Apart from the marvelous and fanciful content of this history, this account would suggest that Guanches had sporadic contacts with populations from the mainland. Al-Idrisi also described the Guanche men as tall and of a reddish-brown complexion.

During the 14th century, the Guanches are presumed to have had other contacts with Balearic seafarers from Spain, suggested by the presence of Balearic artifacts found on several of the Canary Islands.

Castilian conquest

The Castilian conquest of the Canary Islands began in 1402, with the expedition of Jean de Béthencourt and Gadifer de la Salle to the island of Lanzarote. Gadifer invaded Lanzarote and Fuerteventura.

The other five islands fought back. El Hierro and the Bimbache population were the next to fall, then La Gomera, Gran Canaria, La Palma and in 1496, Tenerife.

In the First Battle of Acentejo (31 May 1494), called La Matanza (the slaughter), Guanches ambushed the Castilians in a valley and killed many. Only one in five of the Castilians survived, including the leader of the expedition, Alonso Fernandez de Lugo.

Lugo later returned to the island with the alliance of the kings of the southern part of the island, and defeated the Guanches in the Battle of Aguere. The northern Menceyatos or provinces fell after the Second Battle of Acentejo with the defeat of the successor of Bencomo, Bentor, Mencey of Taoro—what is now the Orotava Valley—in 1496.

Various scholars have used the term "genocide" to describe the conquest of the Canary Islands. Mohamed Adhikhari argues that the Canary Islands were the scene of "Europe's first overseas settler colonial genocide", and that the mass killing and enslavement of natives, along with forced deportation, sexual violence and confiscation of land and children constituted an attempt to "destroy in whole" the Guanche people. The tactics used in the Canary Islands in the 15th century served as a model for the Iberian colonisation of the Americas.

Language

The native Guanche language is now known only through a few sentences and individual words, supplemented by several placenames. Many modern linguists propose that it belongs to the Berber branch of the Afroasiatic languages.

However, while there are recognizable Berber words (particularly with regards to agriculture) within the Guanche language, no Berber grammatical inflections have been identified; there is a large stock of vocabulary that does not bear any resemblance to Berber whatsoever.

System of beliefs

Religion and mythology 

Little is known of the religion of the Guanches. There was a general belief in a supreme being, called Achamán in Tenerife, Acoran in Gran Canaria, Eraoranhan in Hierro, and Abora in La Palma. The women of Hierro worshipped a goddess called Moneiba. According to tradition, the male and female gods lived in mountains, from which they descended to hear the prayers of the people. On other islands, the natives venerated the sun, moon, earth and stars. A belief in an evil spirit was general. The demon of Tenerife was called Guayota and lived at the peak of Teide volcano, which was the hell called Echeyde; in Tenerife and Gran Canaria, the minor demons took the form of wild black woolly dogs called Jucanchas in the first and Tibicenas in the latter, which lived in deep caves of the mountains, emerging at night to attack livestock and human beings.

In Tenerife, Magec (god of the Sun) and Chaxiraxi (the goddess mother) were also worshipped. In times of drought, the Guanches drove their flocks to consecrated grounds, where the lambs were separated from their mothers in the belief that their plaintive bleating would melt the heart of the Great Spirit. During the religious feasts, hostilities were held in abeyance, from war to personal quarrels.

Idols have been found in the islands, including the Idol of Tara (Museo Canario, Las Palmas de Gran Canaria) and the Guatimac (Museum Archaeological of Puerto de la Cruz in Tenerife). But many more figures have been found in the rest of the archipelago.

Most researchers agree that the Guanches performed their worship in the open, under sacred trees such as pine or drago, or near sacred mountains such as Mount Teide, which was believed to be the abode of the devil Guayota. Mount Teide was sacred to the aboriginal Guanches and since 2007 is a World Heritage Site. But sometimes the Guanches also performed worship in caves, as in "Cave of Achbinico" in Tenerife. Until the 20th century, there were in the Canary Islands (especially in northern Tenerife) individuals called "Animeros". They were similar to healers and mystics with a syncretic beliefs combining elements of the Guanche religion and Christianity. As in other countries close to the islands (e.g. marabouts from the Maghreb), the Animeros were considered "persons blessed by God".

Aboriginal priests
The Guanches had priests or shamans who were connected with the gods and ordained hierarchically:

Guatimac

Festivities
Beñesmen or Beñesmer was a festival of the agricultural calendar of the Guanches (the Guanche new year) to be held after the gathering of crops devoted to Chaxiraxi (on August 15). In this event the Guanches shared milk, gofio, sheep or goat meat. At the present time, this coincides with the pilgrimage to the Basilica of the Virgin of Candelaria (Patron of Canary Islands).

Among the cultural events are significant traces of aboriginal traditions at the holidays and in the current Romería Relief in Güímar (Tenerife) and the lowering of the Rama, in Agaete (Gran Canaria).

Funerals and mummies 

Mummification was not commonly practiced throughout the islands but was highly developed on Tenerife in particular. In Gran Canaria there is currently a debate on the true nature of the mummies of the ancient inhabitants of the island, as researchers point out that there was no real intention to mummify the deceased and that the good conservation of some of them is due rather to environmental factors. In La Palma they were preserved by these environmental factors and in La Gomera, and El Hierro the existence of mummification is not verified. In Lanzarote and Fuerteventura this practice is ruled out.

Two almost inaccessible caves in a vertical rock by the shore  from Santa Cruz on Tenerife are said still to contain remains. The process of embalming seems to have varied. In Tenerife and Gran Canaria, the corpse was simply wrapped up in goat and sheep skins, while in other islands a resinous substance was used to preserve the body, which was then placed in a cave difficult to access, or buried under a tumulus. The work of embalming was reserved for a special class, with women tending to female corpses, and men for the male ones. Embalming seems not to have been universal.

In the Museo de la Naturaleza y el Hombre (Santa Cruz de Tenerife) mummies of original inhabitants of the Canary Islands are displayed.

In 1933, the largest Guanche necropolis of the Canary Islands was found, at Uchova in the municipality of San Miguel de Abona in the south of the island of Tenerife. This cemetery was almost completely looted; it is estimated to have contained between 60 and 74 mummies.

Sacrifices 
Although little is known about this practice among them, it has been shown that they performed both animal sacrifices and human sacrifices.

In Tenerife during the summer solstice, the Guanches were accustomed to kill livestock and throw them into a fire as an offering to the gods. Bethencourt Alfonso has claimed that goat kids were tied by the legs, alive, to a stake so that they could be heard bleating by the gods. It is likely that animals were also sacrificed on the other islands.

As for human sacrifices, in Tenerife it was the custom to throw the Punta de Rasca a living child at sunrise at the summer solstice. Sometimes these children came from all parts of the island, even from remote areas of Punta de Rasca. It follows that it was a common custom of the island. On this island sacrificing other human victims associated with the death of the king, where adult men rushed to the sea are also known. Embalmers who produced the Guanche mummies also had a habit of throwing into the sea one year after the king's death.

Bones of children mixed with lambs and kids were found in Gran Canaria, and in Tenerife amphorae have been found with remains of children inside. This suggests a different kind of ritual infanticide to those who were thrown overboard.

Child sacrifice has been seen in other cultures, especially in the Mediterranean—Carthage (now Tunisia), Ugarit in the current Syria, Cyprus and Crete.

Political system 

The political and social institutions of the Guanches varied. In some islands like Gran Canaria, hereditary autocracy by matrilineality prevailed, in others the government was elective. In Tenerife all the land belonged to the kings who leased it to their subjects. In Gran Canaria, suicide was regarded as honourable, and whenever a new king was installed, one of his subjects willingly honoured the occasion by throwing himself over a precipice. In some islands, polyandry was practised; in others they were monogamous. Insult of a woman by an armed man was allegedly a capital offense. Anyone accused of a crime had to attend a public trial in Tagoror, a public court where those prosecuted were sentenced after a trial.

The island of Tenerife was divided into nine small kingdoms (menceyatos), each ruled by a king or Mencey. The Mencey was the ultimate ruler of the kingdom, and at times, meetings were held between the various kings. When the Castilians invaded the Canary Islands, the southern kingdoms joined the Castilian invaders on the promise of the richer lands of the north; the Castilians betrayed them after ultimately securing victory at the Battles of Aguere and Acentejo.

Kings (Menceys) of Tenerife 
Acaimo or Acaymo of Menceyato de Tacoronte
Adjona of Menceyato de Abona
Añaterve of Menceyato de Güímar
Bencomo of Menceyato de Taoro
Beneharo of Menceyato de Anaga
Pelicar of Menceyato de Adeje
Pelinor of Menceyato de Icode
Romen of Menceyato de Daute
Tegueste of Menceyato de Tegueste

In Tenerife the grand Mencey Tinerfe and his father Sunta governed the unified island, which afterwards was divided into nine kingdoms by the children of Tinerfe.

Clothes and weapons 
Guanches wore garments made from goat skins or woven from plant fibers called Tamarcos, which have been found in the tombs of Tenerife. They had a taste for ornaments and necklaces of wood, bone and shells, worked in different designs. Beads of baked earth, cylindrical and of all shapes, with smooth or polished surfaces, mostly colored black and red, were fairly common. Dr. René Verneau suggested that the objects the Castilians referred to as pintaderas, baked clay seal-shaped objects, were used as vessels for painting the body in various colours. They manufactured rough pottery, mostly without decorations, or ornamented by making fingernail indentations.

Guanche weapons adapted to the insular environment (using wood, bone, obsidian and stone as primary materials), with later influences from medieval European weaponry. Basic armaments in several of the islands included javelins of 1 to 2 m in length (known as Banot on Tenerife); round, polished stones; spears; maces (common in Gran Canaria and Tenerife, and known as Magado and Sunta, respectively); and shields (small in Tenerife and human-sized in Gran Canaria, where they were known as Tarja, made of Drago wood  and painted with geometric shapes). After the arrival of the Europeans, Guanche nobility from Gran Canaria were known to wield large wooden swords (larger than the European two-handed type) called Magido, which were said to be very effective against both infantrymen and cavalry. Weaponry made of wood was hardened with fire. These armaments were commonly complemented with an obsidian knife known as Tabona.

Dwellings were situated in natural or artificial caves in the mountains. In areas where cave dwellings were not feasible, they built small round houses and, according to the Castilians, practiced crude fortification.

Genetics

 extracted 71 samples of mtDNA from Guanches buried at numerous Canary Islands c. 1000 AD. The examined Guanches were found to have closest genetic affinities to modern Moroccan Berbers, Canary Islanders and Spaniards. They carried a significantly high amount of the maternal haplogroup U6b1. U6b1 is found at very low frequencies in North Africa today, and it was suggested that later developments have significantly altered the Berber gene pool. The authors of the study suggested that the Guanches were descended from migrants from mainland North Africa related to the Berbers, and that the Guanches contributed c. 42%–73% to the maternal gene pool of modern Canary Islanders.

 extracted 30 samples of Y-DNA from Guanches of the Canary Islands. These belonged to the paternal haplogroups E1a*, (3.33%), E1b1b1a* (23.33%), E1b1b1b* (26.67%), I* (6.67%), J1* (16.67%), K*, P* (3.33%), and R1b1b2 (10.00%). E1a*, E1b1b1a* and E1b1b1b* are common lineages among Berbers, and their high frequency among the Guanches were considered evidence that they were migrants from North Africa. R1b1b2 and I* are very common in lineages in Europe, and their moderate frequency among the examined Guanche males was suggested to have been a result of prehistoric gene flow from Europe into the region across the Mediterranean. It was found that Guanche males contributed less to the gene pool of modern Canary Islanders than Guanche females (as would be expected from the extremely bloody conquest of the islands). Haplogroups typical among the Guanche has been found at high frequencies in Latin America, suggesting that descendants of the Guanche played an active role in the Spanish colonization of the Americas.

 extracted the mtDNA of 30 Guanches from La Palma, (Benahoaritas). 93% of their mtDNA haplogroups were found to be of West Eurasian origin, while 7% were of sub-Saharan African origin. About 15% of their West Eurasian maternal lineages are specific to Europe and the Near East rather than North Africa, suggesting that the Benahoaritas traced partial descent from either of these regions. The examined Benahoaritas were found to have high frequencies of the maternal haplogroups U6b1 and H1-16260. U6b1 has not been found in North Africa, while H1-16260 is "extremely rare". The results suggested that the North African population from whom the Benahoaritas and other Guanches descended have been largely replaced by subsequent migrations.

 studies the origins of the maternal haplogroup U6, which is characteristic of Guanches. It was suggested that the U6 was brought to North Africa by Cro-Magnon-like humans from the Near East during the Upper Paleolithic, who were probably responsible for the formation of the Iberomaurusian culture. It was also suggested that the maternal haplogroup H1, also frequent among Guanches, was brought to North Africa during the Holocene by migrants from Iberia, who may have participated in the formation of the Capsian culture. In a further study,  suggested that U6 was brought to the Levant from Central Europe in the Upper Paleolithic by people of the Aurignacian culture, forming the Levantine Aurignacian (c. 33000 BC), whose descendants had then further spread U6 as part of a remigration into Africa. U6b1a was suggested to have been brought to the Canary Islands during the initial wave of settlement by Guanches, while U6c1 was suggested to have been brought in a second wave.

 examined the mtDNA of Guanches of La Gomera (Gomeros). 65% of the examined Gomero swere found to be carriers of the maternal haplogroup U6b1a. The Gomero appeared to be descended from the earliest wave of settlers to the Canary Islands. The maternal haplogroups T2c1 and U6c1 may have been introduced in a second wave of colonization affecting the other islands. It was noted that 44% of modern La Gomerans carry U6b1a. It was determined that La Gomerans have the highest amount of Guanche ancestry among modern Canary Islanders.

 examined the remains of a large number of Guanches of El Hierro (Bimbache) buried at Punta Azul, El Hierro c. 1015–1200 AD. The 16 samples of Y-DNA extracted belonged to the paternal haplogroups E1a (1 sample), E1b1b1a1 (7 samples) and R1b1a2 (7 samples). All the extracted samples of mtDNA belonged to the maternal haplogroup H1-1626. The Bimbache were identified as descendants of the first wave of Guanche settlers on the Canary Islands, as they lacked the paternal and maternal lineages identified with the hypothetical second wave.

 examined the atDNA of 11 Guanches buried at Grand Canaria and Tenerife. The 3 samples of Y-DNA extracted all belonged to the paternal haplogroup E1b1b1b1a1 (E-M183), while the 11 samples of mtDNA extracted belonged to the maternal haplogroups H1cf, H2a, L3b1a (3 samples), T2c12, U6b1a (3 samples), J1c3 and U6b. It was determined that the examined Guanches were genetically similar between the 7th and 11th centuries AD, and that they displayed closest genetic affinity to modern North Africans. The evidence supported the notion that the Guanches were descended from a Berber-like population who had migrated from mainland North Africa. Among modern populations, Guanches were also found to be genetically similar to modern Sardinians. Some models found the Guanche to be more closely related to modern Sardinians than modern North Africans. They were determined to be carriers of Early European Farmer (EEF) ancestry, which probably spread into North Africa from Iberia during the Neolithic, or perhaps also later. One Guanche was also found to have ancestry related to European hunter-gathers, providing further evidence of prehistoric gene flow from Europe. It was estimated that modern Canary Islanders derive 16%–31% of their atDNA from the Guanches.

 examined remains at the Late Neolithic site of Kelif el Boroud, Morocco (c. 3780–3650 BC). The Kelif el Boroud people were modeled as being equally descended from people buried at the Neolithic sites of Ifri N'Ammar, Morocco (c. 5325–4786 BC) and the Cave of El Toro, Spain (5280–4750 BC). The Kelif el Boroud were thus determined to have carried 50% EEF ancestry, which may have spread with the Cardial Ware culture from Iberia to North Africa during the Neolithic. After the Kelif el Boroud people, additional European ancestry may have been brought to the region from Iberia by people of the Bell Beaker culture. Guanches were found to the genetically very similar to the Kelif el Boroud people.

 examined the mtDNA of 48 Guanches buried on all the islands of the Canaries. They were found to be carrying maternal lineages characteristic of both North Africa, Europe and the Near East, with Eurasian lineages centered around the Mediterranean being the most common. It was suggested that some of these Eurasian haplogroups had arrived in the region through Chalcolithic and Bronze Age migrations from Europe. Genetic diversity was found to be the highest at Gran Canaria, Tenerife, and La Palma, while Lanzarote, Fuerteventura and particularly La Gomera and El Hierro had low diversity. Significant genetic differences were detected between Guanches of western and eastern islands, which supported the notion that Guanches were descended from two distinct migration waves. It was considered significant that 40% of all examined Guanches so far belonged to the maternal haplogroup H.

Mitochondrial DNA  
 
Regarding mitochondrial DNA, the maternal lineages are characterized by the prevalence of North-African lineages, followed by Europeans and finally in an small percentage by Sub-Saharans. According to different studies the percentages are the following.

Autosomal DNA  

Another recent study that took as reference to 400 adult men and women of all the islands, except La Graciosa, that intended to know the relationship of Canarian genetic diversity with the more prevalent complex diseases in the archipelago, detected that Canarian DNA shows distinctive genetics, result from different variables as the geographical isolation of the islands, the adaptation to environment of its inhabitants and the historical mixture of Pre-Hispanic population of the archipelago ( coming from the North of Africa), with European and Sub-Saharan individuals. Specifically, estimated that the Canarian population, at an autosomal level, is 75% European, 22% North-African and 3% Sub-Saharan.

Here below is included the average per island of North-African and Sub-Saharan respectively.

Source: Genomic Ancestry Proportions (from ADMIXTURE, K-4) in Canary Islanders (Guillen-Guio et al. 2018)

 Archeological sites 
The main and most significant archaeological sites on each island are:

 Lanzarote: Zonzamas
 Fuerteventura: Montaña de Tindaya
 Gran Canaria: Painted Cave of Gáldar
 Tenerife: Masca's solar station
 La Gomera: Fortress of Chipude
 La Palma: Cave of Belmaco
 El Hierro: Archaeological zone of El Julan

 Museums 

Many of the islands' museums possess collections of archaeological material and human remains from the prehistory and history of the archipelago of the Canaries. Some of the most important are:

 Museo de la Naturaleza y el Hombre (Santa Cruz de Tenerife).
 Museo Canario (Las Palmas de Gran Canaria).
 Museum of History and Anthropology of Tenerife (Casa Lercaro, San Cristóbal de La Laguna, Tenerife).
 Archaeological Museum of Puerto de la Cruz (Puerto de la Cruz, Tenerife).

 New religious movement 
In 2001, the Church of the Guanche People (Iglesia del Pueblo Guanche), a Neopagan movement with several hundred followers, was founded in San Cristóbal de La Laguna (Tenerife).La Opinión de Tenerife on religious minorities in the Canaries 

 Guanches 
 Dacil; princess and daughter of mencey Bencomo. She is known as the Pocahontas of the Canary Islands; she was presented to king of Spain with her father and was married to the first Spanish settler. 
Taoro
Beneharo (Guanche King in Tenerife).
Tinguaro
Bencomo
Tanausu
Maninidra
Acaimo
Zanata Stone

See also
Guanche language
Hamitic
Silbo Gomero – a Guanche whistling language, still extant
Isleños
First Battle of Acentejo
Battle of Aguere
Second Battle of Acentejo
Teide
Achinet
Animero
Beñesmen

 References 

 Bibliography and further reading 

 Alfred W. Crosby, Ecological Imperialism: The Biological Expansion of Europe, 900–1900, 1993
 
 
 
 
 
 
 
 John Mercer, The Canary Islanders: Their History, Conquest & Survival,'' 1980
 
 
 
 Roman Trade with the Canary Islands, Archaeology 50.3 (1997)
 The Voyages of Christopher Columbus
 E. G. Bourne, ed., The Northmen, Columbus and Cabot (New York, 1906) 
 Canarias.com – Guanches

External links

Canary Islands – Los Guanches at Rare Plants
Museums of Tenerife.
Archaeology of the Guanches and the Galdar Painted cave 

Ancient peoples
Indigenous peoples of North Africa
History of the Canary Islands
Guanche
Extinct ethnic groups